Tam Nông District may refer to several rural districts in Vietnam:

Tam Nông District, Đồng Tháp, in the Mekong Delta region
Tam Nông District, Phú Thọ, in the Northeast region